Wagner da Silva Souza (born 30 January 1990), commonly known as Waguininho, is a Brazilian footballer who plays as a striker for Avaí, on loan from Cruzeiro.

Career
Waguininho joined the K League 2 side Bucheon FC 1995 in January 2016.

References

External links

1990 births
Living people
Association football forwards
Brazilian footballers
Brazilian expatriate footballers
Campeonato Brasileiro Série B players
Campeonato Brasileiro Série C players
Mogi Mirim Esporte Clube players
Oeste Futebol Clube players
Coritiba Foot Ball Club players
Cruzeiro Esporte Clube players
Avaí FC players
Bucheon FC 1995 players
Suwon Samsung Bluewings players
K League 2 players
K League 1 players
Expatriate footballers in South Korea
Brazilian expatriate sportspeople in South Korea
People from Cubatão